Slough Museum is an independent museum in Slough in the English county of Berkshire. It has two exhibition galleries presenting the past, present and future of the town.

History
The museum began collecting artefacts in 1986 and opened to the public the same year, and has 10,000 objects and photographs relating to the development of Slough. It moved to the eastern end of Slough High Street in 1997

References

External links
 Slough Museum website

Museums in Berkshire
Culture in Slough
Museums with year of establishment missing
Local museums in Berkshire
Buildings and structures in Slough
Organisations based in Slough